Below is the list of populated places in Kırklareli Province, Turkey by the districts. In the following lists first place in each list is the administrative center of the district.

Kırklareli

Kırklareli
Ahmetçe, Kırklareli
Armağan, Kırklareli
Asılbeyli, Kırklareli
Azizbaba, Kırklareli
Bayramdere, Kırklareli
Beypınar, Kırklareli
Çağalayık, Kırklareli
Çayırlı, Kırklareli
Çeşmeköy, Kırklareli
Çukurpınar, Kırklareli
Değirmencik, Kırklareli
Demircihalil, Kırklareli
Dereköy Bucak, Kırklareli
Deveçatağı, Kırklareli
Dokuzhüyük, Kırklareli
Dolhan, Kırklareli
Düzorman, Kırklareli
Erikler, Kırklareli
Eriklice, Kırklareli
Geçitağzı, Kırklareli
İnece, Kırklareli
Kadıköy, Kırklareli
Kapaklı, Kırklareli
Karadere, Kırklareli
Karahamza, Kırklareli
Karakoç, Kırklareli
Karıncak, Kırklareli
Kavakdere, Kırklareli
Kavaklı, Kırklareli
Kayalı, Kırklareli
Kızılcıkdere, Kırklareli
Kocahıdır, Kırklareli
Koruköy, Kırklareli
Koyunbaba, Kırklareli
Kuzulu, Kırklareli
Paşayeri, Kırklareli
Şükrüpaşa, Kırklareli
Ürünlü, Kırklareli
Üsküp, Kırklareli
Üsküpdere, Kırklareli
Yoğuntaş, Kırklareli
Yündalan, Kırklareli
Yürükbayırı, Kırklareli

Babaeski

Babaeski
Ağayeri, Babaeski
Alpullu, Babaeski
Büyükmandıra, Babaeski
Çavuşköy, Babaeski
Çengerli, Babaeski
Çiğdemli, Babaeski
Düğüncülü, Babaeski
Erikleryurdu, Babaeski
Ertuğrulköy, Babaeski
Kadıköy, Babaeski
Karabayır, Babaeski
Karacaoğlan, Babaeski
Karahalil, Babaeski
Karamesutlu, Babaeski
Katranca, Babaeski
Kuleli, Babaeski
Kumrular, Babaeski
Kuzuçardağı, Babaeski
Minnetler, Babaeski
Mutlu, Babaeski
Müsellim, Babaeski
Nacak, Babaeski
Nadırlı, Babaeski
Oruçlu, Babaeski
Osmaniye, Babaeski
Pancarköy, Babaeski
Sinanlı, Babaeski
Sofuhalil, Babaeski
Taşağıl, Babaeski
Taşköprü, Babaeski
Terzili, Babaeski
Yeniköy, Babaeski
Yenimahalle, Babaeski

Demirköy

Demirköy
Armutveren, Demirköy
Avcılar, Demirköy
Balaban, Demirköy
Beğendik, Demirköy
Boztaş, Demirköy
Gökyaka, Demirköy
Hamdibey, Demirköy
İğneada, Demirköy
İncesırt, Demirköy
Karacadağ, Demirköy
Limanköy, Demirköy
Sarpdere, Demirköy
Sislioba, Demirköy
Sivriler, Demirköy
Yeşilce, Demirköy
Yiğitbaşı, Demirköy

Köfçaz

Kofçaz
Ahlatlı, Kofçaz
Ahmetler, Kofçaz
Aşağıkanara, Kofçaz
Beyci, Kofçaz
Devletliağaç, Kofçaz
Elmacık, Kofçaz
Karaabalar, Kofçaz
Kocatarla, Kofçaz
Kocayazı, Kofçaz
Kula, Kofçaz
Malkoçlar, Kofçaz
Tastepe, Kofçaz
Tatlıpınar, Kofçaz
Terzidere, Kofçaz
Topçular, Kofçaz
Yukarıkanara, Kofçaz

Lüleburgaz

Lüleburgaz
Ahmetbey, Lüleburgaz
Akçaköy, Lüleburgaz
Alacaoğlu, Lüleburgaz
Ayvalı, Lüleburgaz
Büyükkarıştıran, Lüleburgaz
Celaliye, Lüleburgaz
Ceylanköy, Lüleburgaz
Çengelli, Lüleburgaz
Çeşmekolu, Lüleburgaz
Çiftlikköy, Lüleburgaz
Davutlu, Lüleburgaz
Düğüncübaşı, Lüleburgaz
Emirali, Lüleburgaz
Ertuğrul, Lüleburgaz
Eskibedir, Lüleburgaz
Eskitaşlı, Lüleburgaz
Evrensekiz, Lüleburgaz
Hamitabat, Lüleburgaz
Hamzabey, Lüleburgaz
Karaağaç, Lüleburgaz
Karamusul, Lüleburgaz
Kayabeyli, Lüleburgaz
Kırıkköy, Lüleburgaz
Müsellim, Lüleburgaz
Oklalı, Lüleburgaz
Ovacık, Lüleburgaz
Sakızköy, Lüleburgaz
Sarıcaali, Lüleburgaz
Seyitler, Lüleburgaz
Tatarköy, Lüleburgaz
Turgutbey, Lüleburgaz
Umurca, Lüleburgaz
Yenibedir, Lüleburgaz
Yenitaşlı, Lüleburgaz

Pehlivanköy

Pehlivanköy
Akarca, Pehlivanköy
Doğanca, Pehlivanköy
Hıdırca, Pehlivanköy
İmampazarı, Pehlivanköy
Kumköy, Pehlivanköy
Kuştepe, Pehlivanköy
Yeşilova, Pehlivanköy
Yeşilpınar, Pehlivanköy

Pınarhisar

Pınarhisar
Akören, Pınarhisar
Ataköy, Pınarhisar
Cevizköy, Pınarhisar
Çayırdere, Pınarhisar
Erenler, Pınarhisar
Evciler, Pınarhisar
Hacıfakılı, Pınarhisar
İslambeyli, Pınarhisar
Kaynarca, Pınarhisar
Kurudere, Pınarhisar
Osmancık, Pınarhisar
Poyralı, Pınarhisar
Sütlüce, Pınarhisar
Tozaklı, Pınarhisar
Yenice, Pınarhisar

Vize

Vize
Akıncılar
Akpınar
Aksicim
Balkaya
Çakıllı
Çavuşköy
Çüvenli
Develi
Doğanca
Düzova
Evrenli
Hamidiye
Hasbuğa
Kışlacık
Kıyıköy
Kızılağaç
Kömürköy
Küçükyayla
Müsellim
Okçular
Pazarlı
Topçuköy

References

List
Kirklareli